Because of Charley is a 2021 American comedy-drama film directed by Jon Binkowski and starring John Amos, Joop Katana, Ashley Jones, Joshua Wade, Peg O'Keef, Clint Robinson, Erin Cline and Simon Needham.  The film is set in Florida in 2004 when Hurricane Charley occurred.

Cast
John Amos as Grandpa
Ashley Jones as Jesse
Joshua Wade as David
Peg O'Keef as Grammy
Erin Cline as Leigh
Clint Robinson as Michael
Joop Katana as Danno
Simon Needham as Ian

Production
The film was shot in Central Florida in 2020 amid the COVID-19 pandemic.

Release
The film premiered on April 9, 2021 at the Florida Film Festival.  In September 2021, it was announced that Freestyle Releasing acquired North American rights to the film, which was released in digital platforms on October 5, 2021.

Reception
Curt Wiser of OC Movies, TV & Streaming Reviews gave the film a positive review and wrote, "Overall, Because of Charley is a well drawn drama centered around a tragic historical event."

References

External links
 
 
 

2020s English-language films